Axel Méyé Me Ndong (born 6 June 1995) is a Gabonese professional footballer who plays as a forward for Botola club Raja CA and the Gabon national team.

He has competed at the 2012 Summer Olympics In 2012, he played 41 minutes for the national team in a friendly match against South Africa.

Club career
In January 2018, Méyé joined Paris FC.

On the 27th of August 2022, he joined Raja Club Athletic.

Career statistics
Scores and results list Gabon's goal tally first, score column indicates score after each Méyé goal.

References

External links

1995 births
Living people
Sportspeople from Libreville
Association football forwards
Gabonese footballers
Gabonese expatriate footballers
Gabon international footballers
Süper Lig players
Ligue 2 players
Championnat National 3 players
Kuwait Premier League players
Eskişehirspor footballers
Manisaspor footballers
Paris FC players
Qadsia SC players
Raja CA players
Olympic footballers of Gabon
Footballers at the 2012 Summer Olympics
2013 African U-20 Championship players
Expatriate footballers in Turkey
Expatriate footballers in France
Expatriate footballers in Kuwait
Expatriate footballers in Morocco
Gabonese expatriate sportspeople in Turkey
Gabonese expatriate sportspeople in France
Gabonese expatriate sportspeople in Morocco
Gabon under-20 international footballers
Gabonese expatriate sportspeople in Kuwait
21st-century Gabonese people
2021 Africa Cup of Nations players